Emphytoeciosoma is a genus of beetle in the family Cerambycidae. Its only species is Emphytoeciosoma daguerrei. It was described by Melzer in 1934.

References

Pteropliini
Beetles described in 1934